The fly family Dolichopodidae contains approximately 200 genera. These include:

Subfamily Achalcinae
Achalcus Loew, 1857
Apterachalcus Bickel, 1992
Australachalcus Pollet, 2005
Scepastopyga Grootaert & Meuffels, 1997
Xanthina Aldrich, 1902

Subfamily Antyxinae
Antyx Meuffels & Grootaert, 1991

Subfamily Babindellinae
Babindella Bickel, 1987

Subfamily Diaphorinae
Achradocera Becker, 1922
Aphasmaphleps Grichanov, 2010
Arabshamshevia Naglis, 2014
Argyra Macquart, 1834
Asyndetus Loew, 1869
Chrysotus Meigen, 1824
Cryptophleps Lichtwardt, 1898
Dactylonotus Parent, 1934
Diaphorus Meigen, 1824
Dubius Wei, 2012
Emiratomyia Naglis, 2014
Falbouria Dyte, 1980
Keirosoma Van Duzee, 1929
Lyroneurus Loew, 1857
Melanostolus Kowarz, 1884
Nurteria Dyte & Smith, 1980
Ostenia Hutton, 1901
†Palaeoargyra Meunier, 1895
Phasmaphleps Bickel, 2005
†Prochrysotus Meunier, 1907
Pseudargyra Van Duzee, 1930
Shamshevia Grichanov, 2012
Somillus Brèthes, 1924
Symbolia Becker, 1922
Terpsimyia Dyte, 1975
Trigonocera Becker, 1902

Subfamily Dolichopodinae
Afrohercostomus Grichanov, 2010
Afroparaclius Grichanov, 2006
Afropelastoneurus Grichanov, 2006
Ahercostomus Yang & Saigusa, 2001
Ahypophyllus Zhang & Yang, 2005
Allohercostomus Yang, Saigusa & Masunaga, 2001
Anasyntormon Parent, 1932
Apelastoneurus Grichanov, 2006
Aphalacrosoma Zhang & Yang, 2005
Argyrochlamys Lamb, 1922
†Arpactodolichopodites Hong, 2002 (unavailable name)
Cheiromyia Dyte, 1980
†Convexivertex Hong, 2002 (unavailable name)
Dolichopus Latreille, 1796
Ethiromyia Brooks in Brooks & Wheeler, 2005
†Eoeuryopterites Hong, 2002 (unavailable name)
Gymnopternus Loew, 1857
Hercostomus Loew, 1857
Katangaia Parent, 1933
†Leptodolichopodites Hong, 2002
Lichtwardtia Enderlein, 1912
Metaparaclius Becker, 1922
Muscidideicus Becker, 1917
Neohercostomus Grichanov, 2011
†Orbicapitis Hong, 2002 (unavailable name)
Ortochile Latreille, 1809
Paraclius Loew, 1864
Parahercostomus Yang, Saigusa & Masunaga, 2001
Pelastoneurus Loew, 1861
Phoomyia Naglis & Grootaert, 2013
Platyopsis Parent, 1929
Poecilobothrus Mik, 1878
†Prohercostomus Grichanov, 1997
Pseudargyrochlamys Grichanov, 2006
Pseudohercostomus Stackelberg, 1931
Pseudoparaclius Grichanov, 2006
Pseudopelastoneurus Grichanov, 2006
Setihercostomus Zhang & Yang, 2005
Srilankamyia Naglis, Grootaert & Wei, 2011
Stenopygium Becker, 1922
Sybistroma Meigen, 1824
Tachytrechus Haliday in Walker, 1851

Subfamily Enliniinae
Enlinia Aldrich, 1933
Harmstonia Robinson, 1964

Subfamily †Eodolichopoditinae
†Bicercites Hong, 2002 (unavailable name)
†Columnocorna Hong, 2002 (unavailable name)
†Eodolichopodites Hong, 2002 (unavailable name)
†Fushuniregis Evenhuis in Evenhuis & Bickel, 2021 (formerly Wangia Hong, 2002, junior homonym of Wangia Fowler, 1954)
†Haodolichopodites Hong, 2002 (unavailable name)
†Laticopulus Hong, 2002 (unavailable name)
†Longilabia Hong, 2002 (unavailable name)
†Orbilabia Hong, 2002
†Paradolichopodites Hong, 2002 (unavailable name)
†Septocellula Hong, 1981
†Sinodolichopodites Hong, 2002 (unavailable name)
†Sunodolichopodites Hong, 2002 (unavailable name)

Subfamily Hydrophorinae
Abatetia Miller, 1945
Adachia Evenhuis, 2005
Acymatopus Takagi, 1965
Anahydrophorus Becker, 1917
Aphrosylopsis Lamb, 1909
Aphrosylus Haliday in Walker, 1851
Arciellia Evenhuis, 2005
Cemocarus Meuffels & Grootaert, 1984
Conchopus Takagi, 1965
Coracocephalus Mik, 1892
Cymatopus Kertész, 1901
Diostracus Loew, 1861
Lagodechia Negrobov & Zurikov, 1996
Ozmena Özdikmen, 2010
Sphyrotarsus Mik, 1874
Elmoia Evenhuis, 2005
Epithalassius Mik, 1891
Eucoryphus Mik, 1869
Eurynogaster Van Duzee, 1933
Helichochaetus Parent, 1933
Hydatostega Philippi, 1865
Hydrophorus Fallén, 1823
Hypocharassus Mik, 1879
Liancalomima Stackelberg, 1931
Liancalus Loew, 1857
Machaerium Haliday, 1832
Major Evenhuis, 2005
Melanderia Aldrich, 1922
Minjerribah Bickel, 2019
Nanothinophilus Grootaert & Meuffels, 1998
Oedematopiella Naglis, 2011
Oedematopus Van Duzee, 1929
Orthoceratium Schrank, 1803
Paraliancalus Parent, 1938
Paraliptus Bezzi, 1923
Paralleloneurum Becker, 1902
Paraphrosylus Becker, 1922
Parathinophilus Parent, 1932
Peodes Loew, 1857
Rhynchoschizus Dyte, 1980
Scellus Loew, 1857
Scorpiurus Parent, 1933
Sigmatineurum Parent, 1938
Sweziella Van Duzee, 1933
Teneriffa Becker, 1908
Prothambemyia Masunaga, Saigusa & Grootaert, 2005
Thambemyia Oldroyd, 1956
Thinolestris Grootert & Meuffels, 1988
Thinophilus Wahlberg, 1844
Parathinophilus Parent, 1932
Schoenophilus Mik, 1878
Uropachys Parent, 1935

Subfamily Kowmunginae
Kowmungia Bickel, 1987
Phacaspis Grootaert & Meuffels, 1988

Subfamily Medeterinae
Asioligochaetus Negrobov, 1966
Atlatlia Bickel, 1986
Corindia Bickel, 1986
Craterophorus Lamb, 1921
Cryptopygiella Robinson, 1975
Cyrturella Collin, 1952
Demetera Grichanov, 2011
Dolichophorus Lichtwardt, 1902
Dominicomyia Robinson, 1975
Euxiphocerus Parent, 1935
Grootaertia Grichanov, 1999
Maipomyia Bickel, 2004
Medetera Fischer von Waldheim, 1819
Medeterella Grichanov, 2011
†Medeterites Grichanov, 2010
Microchrysotus Robinson, 1964
Microcyrtura Robinson, 1964
Micromedetera Robinson, 1975
Neomedetera Zhu, Yang & Grootaert, 2007
Nikitella Grichanov, 2011
†Palaeosystenus Grichanov, Negrobov & Selivanova, 2014
†Paleothrypticus Ngô-Muller, Garrouste & Nel, 2020
Papallacta Bickel, 2006
Paramedetera Grootaert & Meuffels, 1997
Pharcoura Bickel, 2007
Pindaia Bickel, 2014
Protomedetera Tang, Grootaert & Yang, 2018
Saccopheronta Becker, 1914
†Salishomyia Bickel, 2019
†Systenites Grichanov, Negrobov & Selivanova, 2014
Systenomorphus Grichanov, 2010
Systenoneurus Grichanov, 2010
Systenus Loew, 1857
Thrypticus Gerstäcker, 1864
Udzungwomyia Grichanov, 2018

Subfamily Microphorinae
†Avenaphora Grimaldi & Cumming, 1999
†Curvus Kaddumi, 2005
†Meghyperiella Meunier, 1908
Microphor Macquart, 1827
†Microphorites Hennig, 1971
†Pristinmicrophor Tang, Shi, Wang & Yang, 2019
Schistostoma Becker, 1902

Subfamily Neurigoninae
Arachnomyia White, 1916
Argentinia Parent, 1931
Bickelomyia Naglis, 2002
Coeloglutus Aldrich, 1896
Dactylomyia Aldrich, 1894
Halteriphorus Parent, 1933
Macrodactylomyia Naglis, 2002
 Mberu Capellari & Amorim, 2011
Naticornus Olejníček, 2005
Neotonnoiria Robinson, 1970
Neurigona Rondani, 1856
Oncopygius Mik, 1866
Paracoeloglutus Naglis, 2001
Systenoides Naglis, 2001
Viridigona Naglis, 2003

Subfamily Parathalassiinae
Amphithalassius Ulrich, 1991
†Archichrysotus Negrobov, 1978
Chimerothalassius Shamshev & Grootaert, 2003
†Cretomicrophorus Negrobov, 1978
†Electrophorella Cumming & Brooks, 2002
Eothalassius Shamshev & Grootaert, 2005
Microphorella Becker, 1909
Neothalassius Brooks & Cumming, 2016
Parathalassius Mik, 1891
Plesiothalassius Ulrich, 1991
†Retinitus Negrobov, 1978
Thalassophorus Saigusa, 1986

Subfamily Peloropeodinae
Alishanimyia Bickel, 2007
Chrysotimus Loew, 1857
Cremmus Wei, 2006
Discopygiella Robinson, 1965
Fedtshenkomyia Stackelberg, 1927
Griphophanes Grootaert & Meuffels, 1998
Guzeriplia Negrobov, 1968
Hadromerella De Meijere, 1916
Meuffelsia Grichanov, 2008
Micromorphus Mik, 1878
Nanomyina Robinson, 1964
Neochrysotimus Yang, Saigusa & Masunaga, 2008
Nepalomyia Hollis, 1964
†Palaeomedeterus Meunier, 1895
Peloropeodes Wheeler, 1890
Pseudoxanthochlorus Negrobov, 1977
Vetimicrotes Dyte, 1980

Subfamily Plagioneurinae
Plagioneurus Loew, 1857

Subfamily Rhaphiinae
Ngirhaphium Evenhuis & Grootaert, 2002
Physopyga Grootaert & Meuffels, 1990
Rhaphium Meigen, 1803

Subfamily Sciapodinae
Abbemyia Bickel, 1994
Amblypsilopus Bigot, 1889
Amesorhaga Bickel, 1994
Austrosciapus Bickel, 1994
Bickelia Grichanov, 1996
Bickeliolus Grichanov, 1996
Chrysosoma Guérin-Méneville, 1831
Condylostylus Bigot, 1859
Dytomyia Bickel, 1994
Ethiosciapus Bickel, 1994
Gigantosciapus Grichanov, 1997
Helixocerus Lamb, 1929
Heteropsilopus Bigot, 1859
Krakatauia Enderlein, 1912
Lapita Bickel, 2002
Mascaromyia Bickel, 1994
Mesorhaga Schiener, 1868
Narrabeenia Bickel, 1994
Naufraga Bickel, 1992
Negrobovia Bickel, 1994
Parentia Hardy, 1935
Pilbara Bickel, 1994
Plagiozopelma Enderlein, 1912
Pouebo Bickel, 2008
Pseudoparentia Bickel, 1994
Sciapus Zeller, 1842
Sinosciapus Yang, 2001
†Wheelerenomyia Meunier, 1907

Subfamily Stolidosomatinae
Pseudosympycnus Robinson, 1967
Stolidosoma Becker, 1922
Sympycnidelphus Robinson, 1964

Subfamily Sympycninae
Brevimyia Miller, 1945
Calyxochaetus Bigot, 1888
Campsicnemus Haliday in Walker, 1851
Ceratopos Vaillant, 1952
Chaetogonopteron De Meijere, 1913
Colobocerus Parent, 1933
Erebomyia Runyon & Hurley, 2005
Filatopus Robinson, 1970
Hercostomoides Meuffels & Grootaert, 1997
Humongochela Evenhuis, 2004
Hyptiocheta Becker, 1922
Ischiochaetus Bickel & Dyte, 1989
Lamprochromus Mik, 1878
Liparomyia White, 1916
Micropygus Bickel & Dyte, 1989
Negrobovus Wang, Evenhuis, Ji, Yang & Zhang, 2021
Neoparentia Robinson, 1967
Nothorhaphium Bickel, 1999
Olegonegrobovia Grichanov, 1995
Parasyntormon Wheeler, 1899
Pinacocerus Van Duzee, 1930
Scelloides Bickel & Dyte, 1989
Scotiomyia Meuffels & Grootaert, 1997
Suschania Negrobov, 2003
Sympycnus Loew, 1857
Syntormon Loew, 1857
Telmaturgus Mik, 1874
Tetrachaetus Bickel & Dyte, 1989
Teuchophorus Loew, 1857
Yumbera Bickel, 1992

Subfamily Tenuopodinae
Tenuopus Curran, 1924

Subfamily Xanthochlorinae
Xanthochlorus Loew, 1857

Subfamily incertae sedis
Acropsilus Mik, 1878 (unplaced in Dolichopodidae)
Anepsiomyia Bezzi, 1902
†Gujaratmyia Bickel in Bickel et al., 2022
Haplopharyngomyia Meuffels & Grootaert, 1999
Haromyia Runyon, 2015 (Eniliniinae or Achalcinae)
Hurleyella Runyon & Robinson, 2010
Nematoproctus Loew, 1857 (Diaphorinae or Rhaphiinae)
Nggela Bickel, 2020
Notobothrus Parent, 1931
Phrudoneura Meuffels & Grootaert, 1987
†Prosystenus Negrobov, 1976
†Rajpardia Bickel in Bickel et al., 2022
Urodolichus Lamb, 1922 (Diaphorinae or Rhaphiinae)

References 

Dolichopodidae
List